Arthur Barrett may refer to:
 Sir Arthur Barrett (Indian Army officer) (1857–1926), British Indian Army Field Marshal
 Arthur Barrett (cricketer) (1944–2018), Jamaican legspinner
 Arthur Barrett (footballer) (1927–2011), English footballer for Tranmere Rovers
 Arthur Barrett (Dean) (born 1960), Anglican priest

See also
 Arthur Barratt (1891–1966), officer in the Royal Flying Corps, and the Royal Air Force